Terence Ian Shuttleworth (born 6 July 1963 in Belfast, UK) is a Northern Irish theatre critic and author. He was joint senior theatre critic for the Financial Times from May 2007 until March 2019. He was editor and publisher of Theatre Record magazine from 2004 until 2016. In March 2019 he left the UK for Germany.

Shuttleworth was educated at the Royal Belfast Academical Institution. He received a master's degree in English literature from Queens' College, Cambridge. His reviews have appeared, in addition to the Financial Times, in publications including The Sunday Times, The Guardian, London Evening Standard, The Observer, The Independent, Daily Mail, The Sun, The Scotsman, The Stage, Stagebill, Plays & Players, Screen International, Broadcast, OK!, and City Life.

Shuttleworth is the author of the book Ken & Em (Headline Books, 1994), which is an unauthorised biography of Kenneth Branagh and Emma Thompson. He also contributed substantially to the book Reading the Vampire Slayer: An Unofficial Critical Companion to Buffy and Angel (Tauris Parke, 2001).

He starred in one of the four episodes of the 1998 documentary television series about critics, Critical Condition by Jon Ronson.

References

External links
Official website

British theatre critics
Alumni of Queens' College, Cambridge
Journalists from Belfast
1963 births
Living people